Soay is an uninhabited islet in the St Kilda archipelago, Scotland. The name is from Old Norse , meaning 'island of sheep'.  The island is part of the St Kilda World Heritage Site and home to a primitive breed of sheep.  It is the westernmost point in the United Kingdom, if disputed Rockall is excluded.

Geography
Two sea stacks, Stac Shoaigh (Soay Stac), and Stac Biorach, lie between.

The island is formed of a breccia of gabbro and dolerites and is a single mountain peak rising from the sea-bed, without Ice-Age erosion.

Along with the rest of the archipelago, Soay is owned by the National Trust for Scotland, managed by NatureScot as a nature reserve and is included it the St Kilda World Heritage Site. It is unlikely that this island ever had permanent habitation. Men from Hirta would stay for a few days while gathering wool.

Wildlife
Feral Soay sheep are a relict population of the first sheep brought to northern Europe around 5000BC. They were kept for their wool, which was plucked, not shorn, and made into tweed. Only occasionally were the sheep killed for meat. When the neighbouring island of Hirta became uninhabited, Soay sheep were introduced there too, and more recently they have become widely kept elsewhere as a livestock animal.  Another somewhat less primitive breed, the Boreray, lives on another island in the group.

The island's cliffs hold breeding colonies of many seabirds, including gannet, fulmar, storm petrel, Manx shearwater, razorbill, great skua, Leach's petrel and puffin.

Gallery

See also

 List of islands of Scotland
 History of St Kilda
 List of outlying islands of Scotland
 Lítla Dímun, a similar island in the Faroes, formerly home to a similar breed of primitive sheep.

Footnotes

Uninhabited islands of the Outer Hebrides
St Kilda, Scotland
Seabird colonies